Frances Thompson was a formerly enslaved black transgender woman and anti-rape activist who was one of the five black women to testify before a congressional committee that investigated the Memphis Riots of 1866. She is believed to be the first transgender woman to testify before the United States Congress. Thompson and a housemate, Lucy Smith, were attacked by a white mob and were among many freedwomen who were raped during the riots. In 1876, Thompson was arrested for "being a man dressed in women's clothing".

Early life 
Thompson was born into slavery in Alabama and assigned male at birth. By time she was 26 years old, Thompson was living as a free woman in a Black community in Memphis, Tennessee. She made a living doing laundry and lived openly as a woman, keeping her face clean-shaven and wearing brightly colored dresses.

Memphis Riots of 1866 

The Memphis Riots of 1866 began after a group of black soldiers, women, and children began to gather in a public space in South Memphis. After the police attempted to break up the group, arresting two soldiers, gunshots broke out which subsequently led to rioting. For three days, a white mob targeted communities of black residents, starting fires, killing black people and raping black women.

During these attacks, Thompson's and Smith's house was targeted by white men who questioned their affiliation with union soldiers. Thompson would later testify during the congressional committee that the men demanded that they (Thompson and Smith) make them food, and they obliged. After which, the men demanded a "woman to sleep with", which Thompson refused; the men then gang-raped both Thompson and Smith and robbed them. The group of white men who attacked the women included two police officers.

Congress testimony 
Thompson, along with 170 women and men testified before the US Congress during a committee hearing to document the terror, death, rape, arson and theft they experienced during the riots. In the testimony, Thompson stated that she and her housemate, Smith, did not consent. 

After the hearing, Thompson's testimony became known throughout the south, leading to ten years of raised awareness and persecution for her gender identity. She dealt with both harassment and false accusations, including the claim that she ran a brothel.

1876 arrest 
In July 1876, Thompson was fined $50 and jailed for "cross-dressing." She was forced to undergo numerous physician's examinations in which four physicians "confirmed" that her "biological sex" was male. She identified as a woman. Conservatives used her arrest as a "man dressed in women's clothing" as ammunition to discredit her story of being raped during the riots 10 years prior. This fueled an even larger campaign to refute white racial terror against black people in the south. The discovery of Thompson's identity was also used to discredit other black women's claims of rape by white men, and suggested that the entire congressional report that Thompson had testified in was only manufactured propaganda in support of Reconstruction.

Death 
After she was arrested for "cross dressing," she was sentenced to the city's chain gang, where she was forced to wear men's clothes and abused while serving time. Thompson moved to North Memphis after she was released, but died within the same year of her initial arrest. She was found seriously ill and moved to a hospital where she died of dysentery. Coroner's reports say that Thompson was anatomically male, but newspaper reports stated that some in Memphis had understood her to be intersex, and that she had stated she was "of double sex".

Historical relevance and impact 
Thompson's story is an example of a Black woman reclaiming her body after the injustices of slavery, when slaves didn't have the rights to their own bodies. In addition, she sought justice before the US Congress at a time when free Black women did not often have access to legal support, particularly against the aggressions of white men.

Documenting Thompson's story is related to "transcestry", an idea credited to LGBTQ activist CeCe McDonald. Transcestry is the practice of telling the early stories of transgender people in order to acknowledge their historical existence. Thompson is one such example of a trans woman, living openly according to her own gender identity in 1866.

References 

Created via preloaddraft
1876 deaths
American freedmen
Transgender women
Racially motivated violence against African Americans
Violence against trans women
LGBT African Americans
19th-century American LGBT people
Deaths from dysentery
History of women in Tennessee
History of Memphis, Tennessee